

Fiza By Nexus Mall  

 
Popularly known as Nexus Mall, it was opened to the public in May, 2014. It provides shopping, dining, entertainment and leisure activities.

Events 
 In 2016, they conducted the world's largest micro art workshop which had over 8000 participants.
 In September 2017, Nexus Fiza conducted The Purple Run, which took place across 5 Nexus mall across 4 cities. This run was aimed to create awareness about Alzheimer's, raise money for research and remove the stigma surrounding mental health issues.
 In February 2018, Nexus Fiza hosted a live concert by Arjun Kanungo, a popular Indian singer, composer and songwriter and held the Indian Auto Show, which featured cars from global automobile brands.

Gallery

See also 
 Economy of Mangalore

References 

Shopping malls in Mangalore
2014 establishments in Karnataka
Shopping malls established in 2014